Manly Fast Ferry (trading as My Fast Ferry) is an Australian ferry operator that services the areas of Botany Bay and Port Jackson.

History
Since January 1965, the Port Jackson & Manly Steamship Company and its successors had operated high speed hydrofoil and later JetCat services between Circular Quay and Manly.

In December 2008, the New South Wales State Government, decided the Sydney Ferries JetCat service would cease and called for tenders to operate the service on a commercial basis.

Bass & Flinders Cruises trading as Manly Fast Ferry commenced operating the service on 10 February 2009 on an interim basis until March 2010.

On 1 April 2010, Sydney Fast Ferries commenced a five-year franchise to operate the service. However Manly Fast Ferry continued to operate services between Circular Quay Wharf 6 and Manly East Pier via Taronga Zoo and Watsons Bay.

In July 2014, expressions of interest were sought for the next franchise with Bass & Flinders Cruises, SeaLink Travel Group, Sydney Fast Ferries and Transit Systems responding. In December 2014, the franchise was awarded to Bass & Flinders Cruises.

Operations commenced on 1 April 2015 with three existing vessels from Bass & Flinders fleet along with two leased vessels. Four new Incat built vessels were delivered by the end of 2015, two were 24 metres long and two were 33 metres. In 2017, the company ordered a third 33-metre fast ferry from Incat's Hobart shipyard.

Bass & Flinders also operate an Eco Hopper tourist hop on/hop off service around Sydney Harbour from Darling Harbour to Manly calling at nine locations. but by 2018 this name was no longer used.

In September 2017, Bass & Flinders was renamed Manly Fast Ferry and commenced trading as My Fast Ferry.

In December 2017, the business was purchased by the NRMA. In October 2018, Fantasea Cruising was also taken over by the NRMA with 10 ferries and 10 water taxis on Sydney Harbour and Pittwater. It continues to trade under its existing brand.

References

Ferry companies of New South Wales
Ferry transport in Sydney
Transport companies established in 2009
2009 establishments in Australia